Piotr Danielak (15 October 1913 – 19 July 1969) was a Polish footballer. He played in one match for the Poland national football team in 1938.

References

External links
 

1913 births
1969 deaths
Polish footballers
Poland international footballers
Place of birth missing
Association football midfielders
Warta Poznań players